The following lists events that happened during 1826 in Chile.

Incumbents
Supreme Director of Chile: Ramón Freire (-9 July)

President of Chile: Manuel Blanco Encalada (9 July-9 September), Agustín Eyzaguirre (9 September-)

Events

July
8 July - Chilean presidential election, 1826
9 July - Ramon Freire resigns, handing over power to Manuel Blanco Encalada.

September
9 September - Manuel Blanco Encalada resigns, handing over power to Agustín Eyzaguirre.

Births
2 June - Erasmo Escala (d. 1884)

Deaths
March - José Cortés de Madariaga (b. 1766)

References 

 
1820s in Chile
Chile
Chile